Civita Castellana is a town and comune in the province of Viterbo,  north of Rome.

History
Civita Castellana was settled during the Iron Age by the Italic people of the Falisci, who called it "Falerii."

The abandoned city was repopulated beginning in the early Middle Ages, with the new name of Civita Castellana (roughly translated as "City of the Castle") mentioned first in 994. In the following centuries the city was a flourishing independent commune, often contended by the Pope and the Holy Roman Empire. Captured by Pope Paschal II at the beginning of the 12th century, the city was given as fief to the Savelli by Gregory XIV.

Sixtus IV assigned the city to Cardinal Rodrigo Borgia, the future Pope Alexander VI, who started the construction of the Rocca ("Castle"), which was completed under Julius II.

Civita Castellana became an important road hub with the connection to the Via Flaminia (1606) and the construction of Ponte Clementino sometime after the Battle of Civita Castellana, a French Army victory against a Neapolitan Army here on December 5, 1798 while this community was still part of the 1798-1799 Roman Republic after the fall of the 754-1798 Papal States but before the return of the 1799-1809 Papal States.

Main sights
Santa Maria di Pozzano (Santa Maria Maggiore): the cathedral of the town, it possesses a fine portico, erected in 1210 by Laurentius Romanus, his son Jacobus and his grandson Cosmas, in the Cosmatesque style, with ancient columns and mosaic decorations. The interior was modernized in the 18th century, but has some fragments of Cosmatesque ornamentation. The high altar is made out of a Paleo-Christian sarcophagus of the 3rd or 4th century. The ancient crypt and the old sacristy are also home to examples of central Italian medieval art.
Santa Chiara: church with Renaissance portal from 1529
Santa Maria del Carmine: church with small belltower from the 12th century, including ancient Roman spolia.
San Francesco - Church rebuilt in 18th centuryRocca (citadel) was erected by Pope Alexander VI from the designs of Antonio da Sangallo the Elder, over pre-existing fortifications, and enlarged by Julius II and Leo X.Ponte Clementino, the bridge by which the town is approached, dates to the 18th century.

The town also contains the ruins of the Castle of Paterno, where, on 23 January 1002, Emperor Otto III died at the age of 22.

The National Museum of the Faliscan Countryside contains findings from the ancient Falerii and the surrounding areas.

People
Scalimoli

References

Sources
 Boscolo, Silvia, Luca Creti, Consuelo Mastelloni (1993) Il pavimento cosmatesco della Cattedrale di Civita Castellana.  Biblioteca e società 23(1-2).

 
De Lucia Brolli, Maria Anna, and Jacopo Tabolli. 2013. "The Faliscans and the Etruscans." In The Etruscan World, edited by Jean MacIntosh Turfa, 259–80. Abingdon: Routledge. 
Tabolli, Jacopo, and Jean MacIntosh Turfa. 2014. "Discovered Anew: A Faliscan Tomb-Group from Falerii-Celle in Philadelphia." Etruscan Studies'' 17(1): 28–62.

External links

Falisci
Italic archaeological sites